Xenimpia lactesignata is a moth of the family Geometridae first described by William Warren in 1914.

Distribution
It is known from South Africa.

References
Sources
 Warren (1914). "Descriptions of new species of Lepidoptera Heterocera in the South African Museum". Annals of the South African Museum. 10 (12): 467–510, pls. 40–41.
Notes

Endemic moths of South Africa
Ennominae